The  is a river within the Hida Mountains or Northern Japanese Alps, in the western region of Nagano Prefecture, Japan. The river belongs to the Shinano River watershed, and forms the upper section of the Sai River. The name of the river comes from the  tree found in the river basin, which are used for Azusa Yumi, a sacred bow in Shinto rituals. The river gives its name to the Azusa (train) limited express, which is operated by the East Japan Railway Company (JR East).

Geography
The Azusa River is 65 km long with a watershed of 559 sq km, and has its source on the southeastern slope of Mount Yari in the Chūbu-Sangaku National Park. The river flows through the  valley - designated as one of Japan's National Cultural Assets, on the list of Special Natural Monuments and Special Places of Scenic Beauty. Water from the upper reaches of Karasawa Cirque flows through Hontani and joins the Azusa River near Yokō. From here the river continues through Kamikōchi, under , and then flows through , formed in 1915 following the eruption of Mount Yake, an active volcano in the Hida Mountains. The river then flows northeast through the cities of Azumino and Matsumoto, where it joins the Narai River near Azumino, Nagano, from where it becomes the Sai River, the most important tributary of the Shinano River, Japan's longest river.

The river and its tributaries flow from or past several of the 100 Famous Japanese Mountains including Mount Yari, Mount Hotakadake, and Mount Yake.

The Kamikōchi Line, a private railway in Matsumoto, follows the general course of the Azusa River between Shimonii Station and Shinshimashima Station.

Water Usage

Sericulture
In his 1896 book, Mountaineering and Exploration in the Japanese Alps, the English missionary and mountaineer Walter Weston wrote that the Azusa River was used to power machinery used in sericulture, "The simple machinery for winding off the silk from the cocoons is water powered and gives employment to a score of bright-faced girls, varying from twelve to twenty years of age."

Hydroelectricity

Several dams are operated by Tokyo Electric Power Company, or TEPCO, along the river, including: the Nagawado Dam, the largest, which holds ; Midono Dam; and the Inekoki Dam. The dams use pumped-storage hydroelectricity, and are collectively referred to as the Azusagawa 3 dams.

Irrigation
Several weirs, canals, and underground channels draw water from the Azusa River that are used for irrigation, including for wasabi farming in Azumino.  The Wada Weir is thought to have been completed in 973.

See also
 Chūbu-Sangaku National Park
 Kamikochi
 List of rivers of Japan
 Nagano Prefecture

References

Rivers of Nagano Prefecture
Rivers of Japan